King Wu of Qin (329–307 BC), also known as King Daowulie of Qin (秦悼武烈王) or King Daowu of Qin (秦悼武王) or King Wulie of Qin (秦武烈王), was the ruler of the Qin state from 310 to 307 BC during the Warring States period of Chinese history.

Despite his short time as ruler, King Wu played a part in Qin's wars of unification, mainly through his efforts against the state of Han.  He also invaded some of the other major powers of the Warring States, especially Wei.  In his fourth year, his minister Gan Mao (甘茂), suggested an attack on the Han fortress of Yiyang to open up a path to invade the eastern powers. The campaign succeeded and Qin subsequently gained control of the key roads to the Zhou capital of Luoyang.

While visiting the Zhou capital, King Wu, a keen wrestler, decided to try powerlifting a heavy bronze cauldron in the Zhou palace as a show of his own physical strength, urged on by a strongman he favoured named Meng Yue (孟說).  Though he successfully lifted the cauldron, the king broke his shin bones while trying to carry it.  At night, blood came out of his eyes, and he died very soon afterwards.  He had ascended the throne at the age of 18–19, and died aged 21–22, having only ruled for about three years.

After King Wu's death, Gan Mao left Qin to serve Wei. Since King Wu died young without issue, it threw Qin into a succession crisis, with multiple brother-princes contending for the throne.  Eventually, King Wu's younger half-brother Prince Ji, who was serving as a political hostage at the state of Yan at the time, returned to Qin with the support of his uncle Wei Ran (魏冉) and King Wuling of Zhao and ascended to the throne as King Zhaoxiang.

Family
Queens:
 Queen Daowu, of the Wei lineage of the Ji clan of Wei, a princess of Wei by birth

Ancestry

In fiction and popular culture
 Portrayed by Ba Tu in The Legend of Mi Yue (2015)
 Portrayed by He Ziming in The Qin Empire II: Alliance (2012)

References

320s BC births
300s BC deaths
4th-century BC Chinese monarchs
Rulers of Qin